99th Street–Beverly Hills is one of five Metra stations within the Beverly Hills neighborhood of Chicago, Illinois, along the Beverly Branch of the Rock Island District Line. The station is located at 9901 South Walden Parkway near 99th Street,  from LaSalle Street Station, the northern terminus of the line. In Metra's zone-based fare system, 99th Street is in zone C. As of 2018, 99th Street–Beverly Hills is the 81st busiest of Metra's 236 non-downtown stations, with an average of 645 weekday boardings.

As of 2022, 99th Street–Beverly Hills is served by 20 trains in each direction on weekdays, by 10 inbound trains and 11 outbound trains on Saturdays, and by eight trains in each direction on Sundays.

Despite the name of the station, parking is not available along 99th Street. There are two long parking lots along the line between 100th Street and 101st Street, and two smaller parking lots north of 100th Street along both South Walden Parkway and Wood Street. No bus connections are available.

References

External links

Station from 99th Street from Google Maps Street View

Metra stations in Chicago
Former Chicago, Rock Island and Pacific Railroad stations